Kenneth LeRoy Erickson (May 15, 1926 – January 14, 1997)  was an American farmer and politician who was a member of the North Dakota House of Representatives and North Dakota Senate.  He was a delegate to the 1971-1972 North Dakota Constitutional Convention.

Erickson was born near De Lamere, North Dakota. He was the son of Edward Selmer Erickson (1894-1965) and Agnes Martinson Erickson (1896-1967). In 1944, his parents retired and he began farming his family farm in rural Sargent County. He also served on the Council of Immanuel Lutheran Church in DeLamere and as a Township Supervisor for Hall Township in Sargent County.

He represented District 26 in the North Dakota House from 1967 to 1968 and 1973-1980 and in the Senate from 1981 to 1984.

References

1926 births
1997 deaths
People from Sargent County, North Dakota
Republican Party North Dakota state senators
Republican Party members of the North Dakota House of Representatives
American Lutherans
20th-century American politicians
American people of Norwegian descent
20th-century Lutherans